The 2011 Extreme Sailing Series is the fifth edition of the sailing series. This is the second year without the original sponsor iShares. The 2011 series started in Muscat, Oman on 22 February 2011 and ended in Almeria, Spain on 11 December 2011 and took place in 9 cities around the world.

Acts

Act 1: Muscat, Oman 
The first act of the series was held in Muscat, Oman between 22 and 24 February 2011.

Act 2: Qingdao, China 
Qingdao, China was the second act for the 2011 series, and was held on 15–17 April 2011.

Act 3: Istanbul, Turkey 
Istanbul, Turkey was the host of the third act of the 2011 series, on the weekend of 27–29 May 2011.

Act 4: Boston, USA 
The fourth act of 2011 was in Boston, United States and was held between 30 June - 4 July 2011.

Act 5: Cowes, UK 
The second act of the series was held again in Cowes, UK. The birthplace to the America's Cup, this act was held during Cowes Week between 6–12 August 2011.

Act 6: Trapani, Italy 
Trapani, Italy was the sixth act this year, held between 16 and 18 September 2011.

Act 7: Nice, France 
Between 30 September and 2 October 2011, Nice, France hosted the seventh act of the series.

Act 8: Almeria, Spain 
Almeria, Spain was the host for the penultimate act of the 2011 series, being held on 12–16 October 2011.

Act 9: Singapore 
Singapore was the final act in 2011, and was held on 9–11 December 2011.

Teams
The teams included:

Alinghi
Tanguy Cariou, Yann Guichard, Nils Frei and Yves Detrey.

Artemis Racing
Terry Hutchinson, Santiago Lange, Sean Clarkson, Rodney Ardern, Morgan Trubovich, Julien Cressant and Andy Fethers.

Emirates Team New Zealand
Dean Barker, Adam Beashel, Chris Ward, Andy McLean, Glenn Ashby, James Dagg, Jeremy Lomas and Richard Meacham.

Groupe Edmond de Rothschild
Pierre Pennec, Christophe Espagnon, Thierry Fouchier and Hervé Cunningham.

Luna Rossa
Max Sirena, Paul Campbell-James, Alister Richardson and Manuel Modena.

Niceforyou
Alberto Barovier, Alberto Sonino, Mark Bulkeley, Daniele de Luca and Simone de Mari.

Oman Air
Sidney Gavignet, Kinley Fowler, David Carr and Nasser Al Mashari.

Red Bull Extreme Sailing
Roman Hagara, Hans Peter Steinacher, Will Howden and Craig Monk.

Team Extreme
Roland Gaebler, Bruno Dubois, Sebbe Godefroid, Nicholas Heintz, Michael Walther and William Wu.

Team GAC Pindar
Ian Williams, Brad Webb, Mark Ivey, Mischa Heemskerk, Gilberto Nobili and Jono Macbeth.

The Wave, Muscat
Torvar Mirsky, Kyle Langford, Nick Hutton and Khamis Al Anbouri.

Results 

 = Did not finish

References

External links 
 
 Official gallery

2011
2011 in sailing
2011 in Omani sport
2011 in Chinese sport
2011 in Turkish sport
2011 in American sports
2011 in British sport
2011 in Italian sport
2011 in French sport
2011 in Spanish sport
2011 in Singaporean sport